"Umarme mich" is a song by the German pop duo Ich + Ich and the fourth single released from their first album, Ich + Ich.

Origin and artwork 
The song was written and produced by Florian Fischer, Annette Humpe, Sebastian Kirchner and Adel Tawil. The single was mixed in the Berlin Tritonus Studios, under the direction of Olaf Opal and his assistant Oliver Zülch. The recordings took place in the Berlin-based recording studios Aquarium and Keller, under the direction of Fischer, Kirchner and Tawil. The song was released by the Polydor music label. On the cover, alongside the artist name and the song title, are Humpe and Tawil from Ich + Ich in faded colours.

Release and production 
The first release of "Umarme mich" was available to download from 29 November 2005. The publication of a physical single followed three days later on 2 December 2005, in Germany, Austria and Switzerland. As well as the single version of "Umarme mich", the maxi single contains two remixes of "Umarme mich" from Phil Fuldner and SONO, as well as the songs "Dienen" and "Ich hab Zeit" on the B-side. An exclusive EP was released on ITunes and contained another song on the B-side called "Nur jemand den ich kannte".

Live performances of "Umarme mich" on the radio or other sound broadcasting platforms happened only in Germany, Austria and Switzerland. The duo only performed the song live at their concerts.

Content 
The lyrics of "Umarme mich" were written in German by Humpe. The music was co-written by Fischer, Humpe, Kirchner and Tawil. The song is classified in the pop music genre.

The song is mainly sung by Tawil. Humpe is only heard in the background towards the end, repeating some of the lyrics. The song is about a person who works hard and has had a successful life and career, but their high position in the working world alone does not make this person happy. Only the feeling of being close to a certain partner makes the person happy.

Music video 
Like the group's two previous singles, "Du erinnerst mich an Liebe" and "Dienen", the music video is largely a comic animation. It begins with the everyday life of a small worker who has fallen in love with his colleague. His boss also has his eye on this employee. Ultimately, his boss wins the attention of the employee for himself and the video ends with a sex scene of the two. In between, Tawil can be seen in black and white on various screens] (computer, TV, etc.). As in the previous videos, there is also a small white dog to find in the video, offered at the cash register as a small cuddly toy. Humpe only appears very close towards the end at the side of Tawil. The length of the video is 3:50 minutes. It was directed by Alexander Gellner (animation), Rudi Dolezal and Hannes Rossacher.

Contributions

Song  production 
 Florian Fischer: composer, music producer, sound editor
 Annette Humpe: backing singer, keyboard, composer, songwriter, music producer
 Adel Tawil: singer, composer, music producer, sound editor
 Sebastian Kirchner: composer, music producer, sound editor
 Olaf Opal: mixer
 Oliver Zülch: mixer

Music video 
 Rudi Dolezal: director
 Alexander Gellner: director
 Hannes Rossacher: director

Companies 
 Aquarium: recording studio
 George Glueck Publishing: publisher
 Keller: recording studio
 Polydor Records: record label
 Tritonus Studios: mixing
 Universal Music Publishing Group: publisher

Chart and chart positions 

"Umarme mich" reached #41 in the singles charts in Germany and maintained that position for nine weeks. In Austria, the single reached #17 and held that position for 19 weeks.

This was the fourth chart success in Germany for Ich + Ich and the third in Austria. For Tawil, as a writer, this was his tenth chart success in Germany, and second in Austria. As a producer, it was his fifth chart success in Germany, and fourth in Austria. For Humpe, as a writer, "Umarme mich" was her 21st chart success in Germany, and her ninth in Austria. As a producer, it was her 24th chart success in Germany, and 13th in Austria.

References

External links 
 Music Video on YouTube
 Song on Spotify
 Song on iTunes

2005 songs